The Road Less Traveled is the twenty-first studio album by American country music artist George Strait released by MCA Nashville on November 6, 2001. Certified platinum for sales of one million copies, the album produced the hits "Run", "She'll Leave You with a Smile" and "Living and Living Well", the latter two of which were number 1 hits on the Billboard country charts. "Stars on the Water" and "The Real Thing" also charted at numbers 50 and 60 from unsolicited airplay.

Content
Four of this album's songs are covers: "Stars on the Water" was originally cut by Rodney Crowell on his 1981 album Rodney Crowell; "The Real Thing" by Chip Taylor (as "(I Want) The Real Thing") on his 1973 album Chip Taylor's Last Chance; "Good Time Charley's" by Del Reeves on his 1969 album Down at Good Time Charlie's (as "Good Time Charlie's'); and "My Life's Been Grand" by Merle Haggard on his 1986 album Out Among the Stars. Strait's rendition of "Stars on the Water" features heavy application of Auto-Tune to Strait's vocal track. According to Strait, this was the decision of longtime producer Tony Brown; Strait was initially critical of the technique, but stated that he liked the sound once Brown reduced the amount used.

The song "She'll Leave You with a Smile" is not to be confused with another song with the same name which Strait previously recorded on his 1997 album, Carrying Your Love With Me.

Critical reception

Track listing

Personnel
As listed in liner notes.

Musicians
Eddie Bayers – drums
Steve Conn – accordion
Stuart Duncan – fiddle, mandolin
Paul Franklin – steel guitar
Steve Gibson – electric guitar
Wes Hightower – background vocals
Chris Leuzinger – electric guitar
Liana Manis – background vocals
Brent Mason – electric guitar
Steve Nathan – keyboards
Michael Rhodes – bass guitar
Randy Scruggs – acoustic guitar
George Strait  – lead vocals
Strings performed by the Nashville String Machine under the conduction and arrangement of Steve Dorff.

Production
Chuck Ainlay - engineer, mixing (& additional overdubs)
Tony Brown — production
David Bryant - 2nd engineer (& overdubs)
Eric Conn - digital editing
Tony Green - 2nd engineer (overdubs)
Carlos Grier - digital editing
Russ Martin - 2nd engineer (overdubs)
Justin Niebank - engineer (overdubs)
Jessie Noble - project coordinator
Denny Purcell - mastering
Jeff Socher - 2nd engineer (mixing)
George Strait — production

Design
 Tony Baker - photography
 Virginia Team - art direction and additional photography
 Chris Ferrara - design

Charts

Weekly charts

Year-end charts

References

2001 albums
George Strait albums
MCA Records albums
Albums produced by Tony Brown (record producer)